The 2004 Nalchik raid was an armed attack against headquarters of the regional branch of the Federal Drug Control Service (FSKN) in Nalchik, capital of the Russian republic of Kabardino-Balkaria in the North Caucasus, which took place at about 3 to 6 a.m. of December 14, 2004.

According to the investigation, six to ten attackers, possibly helped by former or current FSKN staff, entered the building without any resistance, shot dead four officers (two guards, a driver and a member of a special unit, all of them ethnic Kabardins, who were first captured and then executed in the basement), looted armory of rapid-response unit, and then set the office ablaze before driving away in a GAZelle minibus loaded with the captured weapons. According to an initial statements by the authorities, 36 assault rifles and 136 handguns were stolen in the attack. Later, however, figures for the lost weapons were put at 79 automatic and sniper rifles and 182 handguns of all kinds.

It was the first-high-profile operation conducted by the local Islamist rebel group Yarmuk Jamaat after it has officially declared the beginning of jihad against Russia in August 2004. The attack however resulted a major crackdown against Yarmuk, resulting in several arrests and deaths of suspected insurgents, among them the group's first leader Muslim Atayev and his wife who were killed in a police raid the following month. The following year, police recovered many of the seized weapons in the wake of the 2005 Nalchik raid, and over half of the group's members were killed, or captured. Fourteen are the subject of a manhunt.

See also
2005 Nalchik raid

References

External links
Caucasus gunmen kill four in raid, BBC News, 14 December 2004
Nalchik Drug Officers Killed , Associated Press, December 17, 2004 (The St. Petersburg Times)
2 Held in Nalchik Attack, Associated Press, 23 December 2004 (The Moscow Times)

21st-century mass murder in Russia
2004 in Russia
Attacks in Russia in 2004
Kabardino-Balkaria
Terrorist incidents in Russia in 2004
2004 murders in Russia